Rodríguez is a small town (villa) in the San José Department of southern Uruguay.

Geography
The railroad track Montevideo - San José - Colonia passes through this town.

History
On 19 July 1909, it was declared a "Pueblo" (village) by the Act of Ley N° 3.548. On 14 June 1960, its status was elevated to "Villa" (town) by the Act of Ley N° 12.733.

Population
In 2011 Rodríguez had a population of 2,604.
 
Source: Instituto Nacional de Estadística de Uruguay

Places of worship
 Our Lady of the Rosary Parish Church (Roman Catholic)

References

External links
INE map of Rodríguez

Populated places in the San José Department